Teatro de la República (literally, Theater of the Republic) is a theater in the historic center of the city of Querétaro, México. It is one of the most important historic buildings in the city.

Buildings and structures in Querétaro
Theatres in Mexico
Querétaro City